Kitros is a village of the Pydna-Kolindros municipality. Before the 2011 local government reform it was part of the municipality of Pydna, of which it was the seat. The 2011 census recorded 1,172 inhabitants in the village. Kitros is a part of the community of Pydna.

See also
 List of settlements in the Pieria regional unit
 Pydna (Ancient Site)

References

Populated places in Pieria (regional unit)